Malachi Curran is a Northern Irish politician.
He was elected to Down District Council in 1981 as a Labour candidate. He did not stand in 1985 but was elected to the same council in 1989 for the Social Democratic and Labour Party (SDLP).

He resigned from the SDLP to stand as a Labour coalition candidate for the Northern Ireland Forum in 1996. Although the group did not win any constituency seats, it was awarded two top-up seats, which went to Hugh Casey and Curran.

Shortly after the elections to the Forum, the Coalition dissolved. Curran was recognised as leader of the Labour group in the Forum.

With seven other leaders of Forum groupings that had supported the Good Friday Agreement, he won the Harriman Democracy Prize of the National Democratic Institute in 1998.

Curran then formed the Labour Party of Northern Ireland. Under this label, he failed to take a seat standing in South Down at the 1998 Northern Ireland Assembly election, winning only 1% of the first preference votes.

Curran stood as an independent at the 2003 elections to the Assembly, but saw his vote drop to 0.4%. At the 2007 election, he placed bottom in South Down, taking just 123 votes.

After leaving politics, Curran became the owner of a pub, the Ann Boal Inn in Killough, County Down, following the death of Ann Boal, who had been a longtime friend of Curran.

References

Year of birth missing (living people)
Living people
Members of Down District Council
Leaders of political parties in Northern Ireland
Members of the Northern Ireland Forum
Social Democratic and Labour Party politicians
Politicians from Northern Ireland
20th-century politicians from Northern Ireland